This is a list of Members of Parliament (MPs) elected to the Parliament of Ghana for the Fourth Parliament of the Fourth Republic of Ghana at the 2004 parliamentary election, held on 7 December 2004.

The list is arranged by region and constituency. New MPs elected since the general election and changes in party allegiance are noted at the bottom of the page. Only eight MPs survived from the First Parliament of the Fourth Republic.

Current composition

List of MPs elected in the general election
The following table is a list of MPs elected on 7 December 2004, ordered by region and constituency. The previous MP and previous party column shows the MP and party holding the seat prior to the election.



Changes
Alhassan Wayo Seini, MP for Tamale Central, left the NDC to join the NPP. He also resigned his seat in parliament.
Dan Abodakpi, MP for Keta constituency, who was also Minister for Trade and Industry in the NDC Rawlings government, was jailed by a Fast Track Court in Ghana for fraud.
Kwadwo Baah Wiredu, NPP MP for Asante Akim North constituency died in Pretoria, South Africa on 24 September 2008.

By-elections
Asawase constituency - 21 April 2005 - Alhaji Muntanka Mohammed Mubarak (NDC) won with a majority of 11,142 replacing the late Dr Gibrine also of the NDC who had won the seat in December 2004 with a majority of 4,474. The Ghana Center for Democratic Development deemed that this by-election was "fair and transparent, but not free from fear."
Odododiodoo constituency - 30 August 2005 - Jonathan Nii Tackie Komey (NDC) won with a majority of 8377 to replace Samuel Nii Ayi Mankattah also of the NDC who had died earlier.
Tamale Central constituency - 4 April 2006 - Alhassan Fuseini Inusah (NDC) won with a majority of 17502. This followed the resignation of Alhassan Wayo Seini (NDC), who resigned to join the (NPP) but lost the resultant by-election.
Offinso South constituency - 24 October 2006 - Owusu Achaw Duah (NPP) won with a majority of 10097. He replaced Kwabena Sarfo also of the NPP.
 Fomena constituency - 23 January 2007 - Nana Abu Bonsra (NPP) won with a majority of 7522. This followed the death of Akwasi Afrifa (NPP).
Nkoranza North constituency - 13 March 2007 - Major (rtd) Derek Oduro (NPP) won with a majority of 43631, after Eric Amoateng had vacated the seat while standing trial in the United States for drug trafficking.

References

Notes

Citations

See also
2004 Ghanaian parliamentary election
Parliament of Ghana
Ebenezer Sekyi-Hughes - Speaker of the Fourth Parliament

External links and sources
GHANA’S PARLIAMENTARY AND PRESIDENTIAL ELECTIONS 2004 by Electoral Commission of Ghana, with support of the Friedrich Ebert Stiftung
MPs on Parliament of Ghana website
Members of Parliament on GhanaDistricts.com
2004 parliamentary election results
Ghana Parliamentary Elections 2004

2004